The 110th Maneuver Enhancement Brigade (110th MEB) is a maneuver enhancement brigade of the Missouri Army National Guard.

Units and formations

110th Maneuver Enhancement Brigade (110th MEB)
1st Battalion, 138th Infantry Regiment - Kansas City
Company A - Kansas City/Boonville
Company B - St. Louis
Company C - St. Louis/Perryville
Company D - Clinton/Anderson
138th Forward Support Company (138th FSC) - Jefferson City
1st Battalion, 129th Field Artillery Regiment (1-129th FAR) - Maryville
Battery A - Albany
Battery B - Chillicothe
Battery D - Independence ("Truman's Own")
1128th Forward Support Company (1128th FSC) - Marshall/Richmond
311th Brigade Support Battalion (311th BSB) - Lexington
Company A - Nevada/Lamar
Company B - Centertown/Lexington
548th Transportation Company - Trenton/Centertown
1138th Transportation Company - Jefferson Barracks/Perryville
135th Signal Company - Lexington

References

External links
 official website

110
Military units and formations in Missouri